Qaleh-ye Bakhtiar (also Romanized as Qal‘eh-ye Bakhtīār and Qal‘eh-ye Bakhteyār) is a village in Hayaquq-e Nabi Rural District, in the Central District of Tuyserkan County, Hamadan Province, Iran. At the 2006 census, its population was 33, in 9 families.

References 

Populated places in Tuyserkan County